Karoline Olsen (born 16 June 1998) is a former Norwegian handball player, who last played for Vipers Kristiansand.

Olsen was a former centre back, but retrained as a left wing.

She also represented Norway at the 2017 Women's Junior European Handball Championship, placing 7th, at the 2016 Women's Youth World Handball Championship, placing 4th and at the 2015 European Women's U-17 Handball Championship, placing 11th.

Achievements
Junior World Championship:
Silver Medalist: 2018
EHF Champions League:
Winner: 2020/2021, 2021/2022
Bronze medalist: 2018/2019
EHF Cup:
Finalist: 2017/2018
Norwegian League:
Winner: 2017/2018, 2018/2019, 2019/2020, 2020/2021
Silver medalist: 2016/2017
Norwegian Cup:
Winner: 2017, 2018, 2019, 2020

References

1998 births
Living people
Sportspeople from Kristiansand
Norwegian female handball players
21st-century Norwegian women